Brian Jackson (born 9 August 1966) is an Australian former professional rugby league footballer who played in the 1980s and 1990s.

Representative Highlights
1984 NSW Schoolboy Open, 1984 Rookie of the Year.

Outside of rugby league
Brian Jackson was previously a physical education teacher at Model Farms High School, Baulkham Hills, New South Wales, and is currently head teacher (Administration Technology) teaching Physics and Chemistry at Gosford High School, New South Wales.

References

1966 births
Living people
Parramatta Eels players
Place of birth missing (living people)
South Sydney Rabbitohs players
Wakefield Trinity players
Rugby league five-eighths
Rugby league centres
Rugby league wingers
Australian rugby league players